R v Clarke, is court case decided by the High Court of Australia in the law of contract.

Facts
Evan Clarke tried to claim the reward of £1000 for giving information that led to the conviction of a murderer, Treffene, of two policemen called Walsh and Pitman, under the Crown Suits Act 1898. A proclamation stated there would be such a reward, which he had seen in May. However, Clarke gave the information in June while he was on trial himself as an accessory for murder. He had originally covered for the murderer, but then had changed his mind and given information. The evidence was reported to be that he gave information to clear himself and not necessarily for the reward. He told the police "exclusively in order to clear himself". It was uncertain whether he was thinking about the reward at the time he provided the information.

Evan Clarke proceeded, by petition of right under the Crown Suits Act 1898, to sue the Crown for £1,000 promised by proclamation for such information as should lead to the arrest and conviction of the person or persons who committed the murders of two police officers, Walsh and Pitman. In the Supreme Court of Western Australia , the Trial Judge, McMillan CJ dismissed the claim, holding that Clarke did not rely upon the offer nor did he intend to enter into a contract, stating Clarke "never was and never intended to be an informer. He only told the truth after his arrest in order to save himself from the unfounded charge of murder". Clarke appealed to the Full Court and the majority, Burnside 
and Draper JJ, upheld the appeal, holding that a contract was created because Clarke had fulfilled the conditions mentioned in the offer.
Northmore J dissented on the bases that (1) Clarke's evidence was that when he gave the information he had no intention of claiming the reward and (2) the offer was to the first person to give information leading to the arrest and conviction.  As one of the murderers, Treffene, was arrested at the same time as Clarke and thus he had not met the conditions of the offer.

Judgment
The High Court held that Clarke could not claim the reward because it was necessary to act in "reliance on" an offer in order to accept it, and therefore create a contract. Isaacs ACJ and Starke J held that Clarke had not intended to accept the offer. Higgins J interpreted the evidence to say that Clarke had forgotten about the offer of the reward.....

Isaacs ACJ said the following.

Higgins J agreed and said the following.

Starke J said "the performance of some of the conditions required by the offer also establishes prima facie an acceptance of the offer." But here it was held that the evidence showed, Mr Clarke had not relied on the offer. So a presumption that conduct which appeared to be an acceptance was relying on an offer was displaced.the defendant was ruled not entitled to a government reward of 1000 pounds for information about the murderers of two police officers when at the time the information was given.

See also
Carlill v Carbolic Smoke Ball Company [1892] EWCA Civ 1
Williams v Carwardine [1833] EWHC KB J44
Gibbons v Proctor [1891] 64 LT 594

Notes

References

Mitchell, P., & Phillips, J. (2002). The Contractual Nexus: Is Reliance Essential?. Oxford Journal of Legal Studies, 22(1), 115-134.

High Court of Australia cases
1927 in case law
1927 in Australian law
Australian contract case law